Thomas Florschütz (born 20 February 1978 in Sonneberg) is a German bobsledder who has competed since 2006. He won a silver medal in the two-man event at the 2010 Winter Olympics in Vancouver.

He won three medals at the FIBT World Championships with a gold (Mixed team: 2009) and two silvers (Two-man: 2008, 2009).

His older brother André competed for Germany in luge and won a silver medal in the two-man event at the 2006 Winter Olympics in Torino.

References

Bobsleigh two-man world championship medalists since 1931

1978 births
Living people
People from Sonneberg
People from Bezirk Suhl
German male bobsledders
Sportspeople from Thuringia
Olympic bobsledders of Germany
Bobsledders at the 2010 Winter Olympics
Bobsledders at the 2014 Winter Olympics
Olympic silver medalists for Germany
Olympic medalists in bobsleigh
Medalists at the 2010 Winter Olympics
21st-century German people